Show Your Dance is Taiwanese Mandopop artist Show Lo's fifth Mandarin studio album. It was released on 16 November 2007 by EMI Music Taiwan. This is Show's first album since moving from Avex Taiwan to EMI Music Taiwan.

The album was available on pre-order and three versions were released including the Show Your Dance (Champion Edition) (舞所不在 舞霸冠軍盤) containing four music videos and Show Your Dance (Collectible Edition) (舞所不在 衛冕慶功黃金典藏版) with a bonus DVD of footages from 2007 Show Lo Cotton USA 《When We Are 2gether》 Tainan Celebration Concert (羅志祥美國棉《當我們宅一塊》台南慶功演唱會).

Album
The album contains 11 tracks, with high-tempo dance track "一支獨秀" (One Man Show) being the first lead track. The other lead track "敗給你" (Lost To You) is a mid-tempo duet with Elva Hsiao. Show composed up-tempo track "操盤手" (DJ) and Karena Lam co-starred with Luo in the music video for "我不會唱歌" (I Don't Know How To Sing), where her parts were filmed on location in Paris, France.

Reception
The album debuted at number one on Taiwan's G-Music Weekly Top 20 Mandarin and Combo Charts; and Five Music Chart at week 46 (16–22 November 2007) with a percentage sales of 25.97%, 12.24%, and 26.68% respectively. It charted continuously in the Mandarin Chart for 18 weeks, the Combo Chart for 15 weeks and the 5 Music Chart for 16 weeks.

The tracks "我不會唱歌" (I Don't Know How To Sing), "敗給你" (Lost To You) and "一支獨秀" (One Man Show) are listed at number 23, 74 and 87 respectively on Hit Fm Taiwan's Hit Fm Annual Top 100 Singles Chart (Hit-Fm年度百首單曲) for 2007.

The track, "一支獨秀" (One Man Show) won one of the three Mandarin Song Grand Prize at the 2007 Metro Radio Hit Awards and one of the Songs of the Year at the 2008 Metro Radio Mandarin Music Awards, both presented by Hong Kong radio station Metro Info. It also won one of the Top 10 Songs of the Year and "我不會唱歌" (I Don't Know How To Sing) won iSing99 Karaoke Song Award at the 2008 HITO Radio Music Awards presented by Taiwanese radio station Hit FM.

The album was awarded one of the Top 10 Selling Mandarin Albums of the Year at the 2008 IFPI Hong Kong Album Sales Awards, presented by the Hong Kong branch of IFPI.

Track listing

Music videos

Releases
Three editions (excludes pre-order editions) were released by EMI Music Taiwan:
 16 November 2007 - Show Your Dance «Preorder Edition» (CD) - includes gifts
 16 November 2007 - Show Your Dance (CD)
 21 December 2007 - Show Your Dance (Champion Edition) (CD+DVD) (舞所不在 舞霸冠軍盤) (CD+DVD) - includes 4 MV's
 "一支獨秀" (One Man Show) MV
 "敗給你" (Lost To You) - feat Elva Hsiao MV
 "我不會唱歌" (I Don't Know How To Sing) - feat Karena Lam MV
 "當我們宅一塊" (When We Are Together) MV

 25 January 2008 - Show Your Dance (Collectible Edition) (舞所不在 衛冕慶功黃金典藏版) (CD+DVD) - includes "最後的風度" (Gentleman-Like Manner) music video and 2007 Show Lo Cotton USA 《When We Are 2gether》 Tainan Celebration Concert (羅志祥美國棉《當我們宅一塊》台南慶功演唱會) live DVD

Charts

References

External links
  Show Lo@Gold Typhoon Taiwan former EMI Music Taiwan

2007 albums
Show Lo albums
Gold Typhoon Taiwan albums